In the United States, dental anesthesiology is the specialty of dentistry that deals with the advanced use of general anesthesia, sedation and pain management to facilitate dental procedures.

A dentist anesthesiologist is a dentist who has successfully completed an accredited postdoctoral anesthesiology residency program of three or more years duration, in accord with Commission on Dental Accreditation’s Standards for Dental Anesthesiology Residency Programs, and/or meets the eligibility requirements for examination by the American Dental Board of Anesthesiology.

United States and Canada
The American Dental Board of Anesthesiology examines and certifies dentists who complete an accredited program of anesthesiology training in the United States or Canada. Dentists may then apply for Board Certification through the ADBA which requires ongoing and continual post-graduate education for maintenance.

The American Society of Dentist Anesthesiologists is the only organization that represents dentists with three or more years of anesthesiology training.

Dental Anesthesiology was the first specialty of dentistry to be recognized by both the American Board of Dental Specialties
http://dentalspecialties.org and National Commission on Recognition of Dental Specialties and Certifying Boards.

See also
Anesthesia
Dentistry

References

External links
American Society of Dentist Anesthesiologists
The American Dental Board of Anesthesiology

Dentistry branches